Demirışık is a small village in the Mezitli district of Mersin Province, Turkey. It is a part of Mezitli district which is an intracity district of Greater Mersin. It is situated in the forests of the Taurus Mountains. The population was 277 as of 2012. The main economic activity is peach horticulture. Apples, plums, and cherries are other crops. During winters, some residents works as wood choppers.

Notable native
Özdemir İnce, poet and columnist

References

External links

Villages in Mezitli District